Common Sense is an American reggae band from Orange County, California. They are known for being one of the first artists to influence the California "surf reggae" movement and using sponsors instead of traditional music industry methods to make albums and gain promotion  as featured in the Mercury Mariner commercial. Since their formation in 1987, they have released five albums under their own label, Common Sense Records. They have also released an  album under the Virgin label, Psychedelic Surf Groove. Their song "Never Give Up" was used in the movie Speed 2: Cruise Control and "In Your Eyes" was in the movie Kingpin. They have toured the US and Mexico and perform periodically at the Belly Up Tavern in Solana Beach, California, and at various music halls around California including the Coach House Concert Hall in San Juan Capistrano. They have, in the past, been members of the summer music and sports festival, Warped Tour and  Willie Nelson's Farm Aid.

The band is also known for making the Chicago hip hop emcee Common Sense condense his name to simply Common because of legal issues.

Band members
 Nick Hernandez – vocals and ukulele 
 Mikey Ortiz - bass guitar
 Billy Sherman – guitar/keyboard
 Phil Gough - guitar
 Tracy Sledge – drums, percussion

Former members
 Jai Vatuk – guitar/keyboard
 Steve Dillard – trumpet/flugelhorn/and Nick's Daddy
 Drew Hester - drums
 Larry Young - Bass Guitar

Discography
Full-length albums:
 Live! At the Belly Up Tavern (1994)
 Psychedelic Surf Groove (1996)
 State of the Nation (1999)
 Common Sense (2002)
 Don't Look Back (2005)

References

External links
 Common Sense Band – Official website
 Common Sense – MySpace page

Alternative rock groups from California
Musical groups established in 1987
American reggae musical groups